Below is a list of newspapers published in San Marino.

Current newspapers
L'Informazione di San Marino
Lo Sportivo.sm
La Serenissima - Il Giornale dei Sammarinesi

Former newspapers
Il Popolo Sammarinese, newspaper of Sammarinese Fascist Party
La Tribuna Sammarinese

Italian newspaper published in San Marino
Il Resto del Carlino
La Voce di Romagna

See also
List of newspapers

External links

San Marino
Newspapers